The 2011 Nigerian Senate election in Abia State was held on April 9, 2011, to elect members of the Nigerian Senate to represent Abia State. Nwaogu Nkechi Justina representing Abia Central, Enyinnaya Abaribe representing Abia South and CHukwumerije Uche representing Abia North all won on the platform of People's Democratic Party (Nigeria).

Overview

Summary

Results

Abia Central 
People's Democratic Party (Nigeria) candidate Nwaogu Nkechi Justina won the election, defeating All Progressives Grand Alliance candidate Anamah Uzomah Kingsley and other party candidates.

Abia South 
People's Democratic Party (Nigeria) candidate Enyinnaya Abaribe won the election, defeating All Progressives Grand Alliance candidate Anyim Chinyere Nyere and other party candidates.

Abia River North 
People's Democratic Party (Nigeria) candidate Chukwumerije Uche won the election, defeating All Progressives Grand Alliance candidate Nnennaya Lancaster-Okoro and other party candidates.

References 

Abia State Senate elections
2011 Nigerian Senate elections
April 2011 events in Nigeria